Darklings is an iOS and Windows Phone video game developed by Turkish studio MildMania and released on November 27, 2013.

Gameplay
Visually similar to Limbo, the aim of this game is to defeat foes by drawing the symbol that appears above their head. The player control a good force called Lum who must destroy all the evil figures.

Critical reception
The game has a Metacritic rating of 88% based on 6 critic reviews.

SlideToPlay wrote "Darklings is a fun and creative little game that uses its darkly cute atmosphere to great effect and requires quick reaction times". 148Apps said " MildMania's Darklings is a wonderfully unique and magical game that relies heavily on gesture-based touch controls. " MacLife wrote " Boasting a minimalistic design style and simple controls, Darklings is a delightful affair that pulls you in further each time you play. " VandalOnline wrote "This game offers a very solid gameplay, addictive for the very beginning, and deep for those looking for a mobile challenge." PocketGamerUK said " A fun and clever action game, Darklings shows how much can be accomplished with a touchscreen control system. "

References

2013 video games
IOS games
Action video games
Video games developed in Turkey
Windows Phone games